Joseph Kearney (22 January 1898 – 14 June 1952) was an Irish hurler and Gaelic footballer who played as a forward for the Cork senior teams.

Kearney first arrived on the inter-county scene when he first linked up with the Cork senior football team. He made his senior debut during the 1920 championship. Kearney later became a regular member of the hurling team as well, and won one All-Ireland medal and one Munster medal in hurling, while he also won one Munster medal as a footballer.

At club level Kearney was a three-time championship medallist with Collegians. He also won a championship medal with St Finbarr's.

Throughout his career Kearney made a combined total of 12 championship appearances. He retired from inter-county hurling following the conclusion of the 1928 championships.

Playing career

University
During his medical studies at University College Cork, Kearney was an automatic inclusion for the Collegians hurling and football teams. In 1922 he was at left corner-forward as UCC faced arch rivals University College Dublin in the inter-varsities hurling decider. Goals proved decisive as Cork powered to a 6-1 to 3-2 victory, with Kearney collecting a first Fitzgibbon Cup medal.

Three years later UCC pulled off a remarkable double with Kearney playing a key role as a dual player. A 7-1 to 2-2 trouncing of University College Dublin secured a second Fitzgibbon Cup medal. Later that year Kearney won a first Sigerson Cup medal as Cork defeated University College Galway by 1-2 to 0-2.

UCC retained their football title in 1926, with Kearney collecting a second Sigerson Cup medal following a 4-3 to 0-2 defeat of University College Dublin.

Club
Kearney first experienced success in the club championship as a member of the University College Cork senior football team. In 1920 he won his first championship medal as UCC defeated three-in-a-row hopefuls Cobh by 5-4 to 0-1.

In 1926 Kearney was lining out with St Finbarr's, who qualified for the final of the hurling championship. Blackrock were the opponents; however, a narrow 6-2 to 5-4 victory gave him a championship medal in that code.

The following year Kearney had further success with the UCC footballers. A 3-3 to 1-0 defeat of Macroom gave him a second championship medal.

University College Cork retained their title in 1928. A 1-6 to 0-2 defeat of Duhallow United gave Kearney a third and final championship medal.

Inter-county
Kearney first played for Cork as a member of the senior football team. He made championship debut on 20 June 1920 in a 2-6 to 0-4 Munster semi-final defeat by Kerry.

On 28 May 1922 Kearney made his first championship appearance with the Cork senior hurling team. His side faced a 5-2 to 1-2 defeat by Limerick in what was the delayed Munster final from the previous year.

Kearney was a regular member of the senior hurling team by 1926. He won a Munster medal following a three-game saga with Tipperary, culminating in a 3-6 to 2-4 victory for Cork. On 24 October 1926 he lined out in his first senior All-Ireland decider, as Cork faced Kilkenny for the first time since 1912. At a snow-covered Croke Park, the first half was even enough with Cork holding an interval lead of one point, however, Kilkenny slumped in the second half, going down to a 4-6 to 2-0 defeat. The victory gave Kearney an All-Ireland medal.

Two years later in 1928 Kearney was at full-forward on the Cork football team that faced Tipperary in the provincial decider. A hat-trick of goals from Kearney secured a 4-3 to 0-4 victory and a Munster medal. He had earlier claimed a second Munster hurling medal as a non-playing substitute following a 6-4 to 2-2 defeat of Clare in a replay. On 9 September 1928 Cork faced Galway in the All-Ireland decider. The Westerners, who got a bye into the final without lifting a hurley, were no match as a rout ensued. Cork triumphed by 6-12 to 1-0 with Kearney collecting a second All-Ireland medal as a substitute.

Honours

Player
University College Cork
Cork Senior Football Championship (3): 1920, 1927, 1928
Sigerson Cup (2): 1925, 1926
Fitzgibbon Cup (2): 1922, 1925

St Finbarr's
Cork Senior Hurling Championship (1): 1926

Cork
All-Ireland Senior Hurling Championship (2): 1926, 1928 (sub)
Munster Senior Hurling Championship (2): 1926, 1928 (sub)
Munster Senior Football Championship (1): 1928

References

1898 births
1952 deaths
Dual players
St Finbarr's hurlers
UCC hurlers
UCC Gaelic footballers
Cork inter-county hurlers
Cork inter-county Gaelic footballers
All-Ireland Senior Hurling Championship winners